Crisis on Conshelf Ten is a science fiction novel written by Monica Hughes for young adults, published in 1975. It was her debut sci-fi novel.

References

External links 

 

Novels by Monica Hughes
1975 Canadian novels
1975 science fiction novels
Young adult fantasy novels
Canadian science fiction novels
Underwater civilizations in fiction
Underwater novels
Debut science fiction novels
1975 debut novels
Hamish Hamilton books